Cteniloricaria is a genus of armored catfishes native to northern South America.

Species 
There are currently three recognized species in this genus:
 Cteniloricaria maculata (Boeseman, 1971)
 Cteniloricaria napova Covain & Fisch-Muller, 2012
 Cteniloricaria platystoma (Günther, 1868)

References 

Harttiini
Fish of Brazil
Fish of French Guiana
Fish of Suriname
Catfish genera
Taxa named by Isaäc J. H. Isbrücker
Taxa named by Han Nijssen
Freshwater fish genera